All Men Are Liars is a 1995 Australian comedy film written and directed by Gerard Lee and starring Toni Pearen and David Price.

Plot

Barry decides to sell the family piano that belongs to his wife Irene. This results in Irene leaving him and their son Mick. Mick desperately wants his mother to return home and so he decides to save up some money to buy the piano back. The town's annual harvest festival is about to commence and an all-female band fronted by the beautiful Angela arrives to participate. Mick develops a wacky scheme in which he dresses up in his mother's clothes and becomes 'Michelle', in hopes of joining the girl band to make the money he needs. The scheme works, however Mick becomes increasingly attracted to Angela who has just broken up with her boyfriend after he cheated on her with the band's ex-guitarist. Mick/Michelle eventually earns enough money to buy the piano back, however Angela has since become close to 'Michelle' and has now developed unexpected feelings for her/him. Angela then begins questioning her sexuality and unfortunately for Mick, she has vowed to kill any man who lies to her again.

Cast

Toni Pearen as Angela
David Price as Mick/Michelle
John Jarratt as Barry
Jamie Peterson as Tom
Carmen Tanti as Irene
Ken Billett as Alf

Production
Gerard Lee first came up with the idea for the film in the early 1980s and wrote several drafts.<ref>Mary Colbert, "All Men Are Liars", Cinema Papers", October 1995 pp. 4–9</ref>

ReceptionAll Men Are Liars was nominated for the 1995 Australian Film Institute Award for Best Film.

The film proved to be successful at the Australian box office grossing approximately $836,606 domestically.

In many of the reviews for the film, critics noted the similarities between this film and the 1959 comedy film Some Like It Hot'' starring Marilyn Monroe, which also had a storyline about two cross-dressing men who join an all-female band and fall in love with the beautiful lead singer.

References

External links 

All Men Are Liars at Oz Movies

1995 films
Australian comedy films
Cross-dressing in film
1990s English-language films